James Ellerbe "Daddy" Neal (May 21, 1930 – October 3, 2011) was an American basketball player who played in the National Basketball Association (NBA).

Neal, a 6'11" center, played college basketball at Wofford College from 1949 to 1953, where he led the NCAA's small colleges in scoring as a senior at 32.6 points per game.  For his career, Neal scored 2,078 points (23.3 per game) and had 1,500 rebounds (16.9).  He set numerous school records at Wofford, including most points in a game (57), highest scoring average for a season (32.6 PPG) and highest season rebounding average (26.5)  At Wofford, Neal received the nickname "Daddy," a reference to his long, thin arms and legs which students compared to a daddy longlegs spider.

Following his graduation from Wofford, Neal was drafted by the Syracuse Nationals with the sixth overall pick of the 1953 NBA Draft.  He played one season for the Nationals, averaging 4.7 points and 3.8 rebounds in 67 games.  Neal played the next season with the Baltimore Bullets, where he averaged 2.9 points and 3.6 rebounds per game until the franchise folded in November 1954.

Neal died on October 3, 2011 in his home in Greer, South Carolina.

References

External links
 

1930 births
2011 deaths
American men's basketball players
Baltimore Bullets (1944–1954) players
Basketball players from South Carolina
Centers (basketball)
People from Greer, South Carolina
People from Newberry County, South Carolina
Syracuse Nationals draft picks
Syracuse Nationals players
Wofford Terriers men's basketball players